Dejan Milićević (Serbian Cyrillic: Дејан Милићевић; born 10 March 1992) is a Serbian football midfielder.

2022 season played for lithuanian Riteriaiin A Lyga.

Honours
TSC Bačka Topola
 Serbian First League: 2018–19

References

External links

1992 births
Living people
Footballers from Novi Sad
Serbian footballers
FK Vojvodina players
FK Cement Beočin players
FK Proleter Novi Sad players
FK TSC Bačka Topola players
FK Riteriai players
Serbian First League players
Association football midfielders